, is a Japanese mixed martial artist currently competing in the Middleweight division. A professional competitor since 2004, he has formerly competed for the UFC, EliteXC, DEEP, DREAM, K-1 (MMA), Shooto, and Pancrase.

Mixed martial arts career

Background
Fukuda was a member of the Yamanashi Gakuin University's wrestling team. At the All Japan University Championships, he placed third in 2002 and second in 2003 in his weight class. Fukuda then joined  Fighting World of Japan Pro Wrestling and made his professional wrestling debut in March 2003.

Early career
In his professional mixed martial arts debut at SuperBrawl, Fukuda surprised many by taking Joe Doerksen to decision. Over the years, he has worked for the Japanese promotions Shooto, Pancrase and K-1.  In February 2007, he made his debut in the EliteXC promotion at EliteXC Destiny. He then lost a close decision to Joey Villasenor on the September 15, 2007 EliteXC: Uprising card.

Fukuda fought at DREAM.8 as a late replacement for Yoon Dong-Sik, where he defeated Murilo Rua by unanimous decision. At DEEP 42, Riki defeated Yuichi Nakanishi via unanimous decision to become the DEEP Middleweight Champion. Fukuda successfully defended the title against Hiromitsu Kanehara at DEEP 46. At DEEP 49, Riki successfully defended the title against Ryuta Sakurai winning the fight via TKO due to knees. During his bout with Sakurai, Fukuda was able to push the pace, causing Sakurai to fall out of the cage twice. In the first round, Fukuda successfully completed a takedown, but in the process Sakurai fell out of the ring and hit his face on the bell. In the second round, Fukuda landed a knee to the midsection which cause Sakurai to fall, but as he fell he landed on the ground outside the ring; head first. Fukuda was given the victory by TKO, when Sakurai was not able to continue from the head injury.

Ultimate Fighting Championship
In October 2010, it was revealed Fukuda had signed with the UFC. Fukuda made his promotional debut against TUF 11 alumni, Nick Ring on February 27, 2011 at UFC 127. Fukuda lost his UFC debut by a controversial unanimous decision (29-28, 29-28, 29-28). All three judges gave Ring the first two rounds with Fukuda winning the final round, despite controlling all three rounds with takedowns. Despite the loss on the scorecards, UFC president Dana White felt Fukuda won the bout and stated on his Twitter account that both fighters would be paid a win bonus.

Fukuda was expected to face Rafael Natal on August 6, 2011 at UFC 133.  However, Fukuda was forced out of the bout due to a knee injury sustained in a car accident and replaced by Costas Philippou.

Fukuda faced Steve Cantwell on February 26, 2012 at UFC 144.  Fukuda defeated Cantwell via unanimous decision.

Fukuda lost to Costas Philippou on July 7, 2012 at UFC 148 via unanimous decision.

Fukuda next defeated Tom DeBlass via unanimous decision on November 10, 2012 at UFC on Fuel TV 6.

Fukuda faced Brad Tavares on March 3, 2013 at UFC on Fuel TV 8 and lost via unanimous decision. Fukuda was subsequently released from the organization after testing positive for banned substances during his post fight drug screening. It was later revealed to be linked to over the counter  cold medicine Fukuda had taken when he fell ill during his process of making weight for the bout.

Road Fighting Championship
In August 2013, Fukuda signed with South Korea based promotion ROAD FC. Fukuda faced Hee Seung Kim in his debut bout at Road FC: Korea 1 on January 18, 2014. He won the fight via second-round TKO.

Fukuda then faced Dong Sik-Yoon at Road FC 16 on July 26, 2014. He won the fight via TKO, extending his post-UFC record to 2–0.

In his next fight, Fukuda faced Dool Hee Lee at Road FC 19 on November 9, 2014. Fukuda controlled the first round, however, the fight was declared a no-contest in the second round, due to accidental groin shots.

Championships and accomplishments
Deep
Deep Middleweight Champion (One time)
Road FC
Road FC Middleweight Champion (One time)

Mixed martial arts record

|-
| Loss
| align=center| 24–9 (1)
| Hoon Kim
| TKO (punches)
| Road FC: Road Fighting Championship 40
| 
| align=center| 2
| align=center| 2:38
| Seoul, South Korea
|
|-
| Win
| align=center| 24–8 (1)
| Nae Chul Kim
| Decision (unanimous)
| Road FC: Road Fighting Championship 36
| 
| align=center| 3
| align=center| 5:00
| Seoul, South Korea
|
|-
| Loss
| align=center| 23–8 (1)
| Jung Hwan Cha
| KO (punches)
| Road FC: Road Fighting Championship 28
| 
| align=center| 2
| align=center| 2:36
| Seoul, South Korea
| 
|-
| Win
| align=center| 23–7 (1)
| Uh Jin Jeon
| TKO (punches)
| Road FC: Road Fighting Championship 24
| 
| align=center| 1
| align=center| 2:52
| Tokyo, Japan
| 
|-
| Win
| align=center| 22–7 (1)
| Dool Hee Lee
| TKO (punches)
| Road FC: Road Fighting Championship 22
| 
| align=center| 2
| align=center| 3:57
| Seoul, South Korea
|
|-
| NC
| align=center| 21–7 (1)
| Dool Hee Lee
| No Contest (accidental knee to groin)
| Road FC: Road Fighting Championship 19
| 
| align=center| 2
| align=center| N/A
| Seoul, South Korea
|
|-
| Win
| align=center| 21–7
| Dong-sik Yoon
| TKO (punches)
| Road FC: Road Fighting Championship 16
| 
| align=center| 1
| align=center| 3:36
| Gumi, South Korea
| 
|-
| Win
| align=center| 20–7
| Hee Seung Kim
| TKO (punches)
| Road FC: Korea 1 
| 
| align=center| 2
| align=center| 2:09
| Seoul, South Korea
| 
|-
| Loss
| align=center| 19–7
| Brad Tavares
| Decision (unanimous)
| UFC on Fuel TV: Silva vs. Stann
| 
| align=center| 3
| align=center| 5:00
| Saitama, Japan
| 
|-
| Win
| align=center| 19–6
| Tom DeBlass
| Decision (unanimous)
| UFC on Fuel TV: Franklin vs. Le
| 
| align=center| 3
| align=center| 5:00
| Macau, SAR, China
| 
|-
| Loss
| align=center| 18–6
| Costas Philippou
| Decision (unanimous)
| UFC 148
| 
| align=center| 3
| align=center| 5:00
| Las Vegas, Nevada, United States
| 
|-
| Win
| align=center| 18–5
| Steve Cantwell
| Decision (unanimous)
| UFC 144
| 
| align=center| 3
| align=center| 5:00
| Saitama, Japan
| 
|-
| Loss
| align=center| 17–5
| Nick Ring
| Decision (unanimous)
| UFC 127
| 
| align=center| 3
| align=center| 5:00
| Sydney, Australia
| 
|-
| Win
| align=center| 17–4
| Ryuta Sakurai
| TKO (knees)
| DEEP: 49 Impact
| 
| align=center| 2
| align=center| 0:32
| Tokyo, Japan
| 
|-
| Win
| align=center| 16–4
| Hiromitsu Kanehara
| Decision (unanimous)
| DEEP: 46 Impact
| 
| align=center| 3
| align=center| 5:00
| Tokyo, Japan
| 
|-
| Win
| align=center| 15–4
| Yuichi Nakanishi
| Decision (unanimous)
| DEEP: 42 Impact
| 
| align=center| 3
| align=center| 5:00
| Tokyo, Japan
| 
|-
| Win
| align=center| 14–4
| Murilo Rua
| Decision (unanimous)
| DREAM 8
| 
| align=center| 2
| align=center| 5:00
| Nagoya, Japan
|Catchweight bout of 196 lbs.
|-
| Win
| align=center| 13–4
| Ryuta Sakurai
| TKO (punches)
| DEEP: 40 Impact
| 
| align=center| 1
| align=center| 0:45
| Tokyo, Japan
| 
|-
| Win
| align=center| 12–4
| Jason Jones
| Decision (unanimous)
| Deep: 38 Impact
| 
| align=center| 2
| align=center| 5:00
| Tokyo, Japan
| 
|-
| Win
| align=center| 11–4
| Hiroki Ozaki
| Decision (unanimous)
| DEEP: 37 Impact
| 
| align=center| 2
| align=center| 5:00
| Tokyo, Japan
| 
|-
| Loss
| align=center| 10–4
| Yuichi Nakanishi
| Decision (unanimous)
| DEEP: 35 Impact
| 
| align=center| 2
| align=center| 5:00
| Tokyo, Japan
| 
|-
| Win
| align=center| 10–3
| Yuya Shirai
| Decision (split)
| DEEP: 35 Impact
| 
| align=center| 2
| align=center| 5:00
| Tokyo, Japan
| 
|-
| Win
| align=center| 9–3
| Ryuta Sakurai
| Decision (unanimous)
| DEEP: 34 Impact
| 
| align=center| 3
| align=center| 5:00
| Tokyo, Japan
| 
|-
| Loss
| align=center| 8–3
| Joey Villaseñor
| Decision (split)
| EliteXC: Uprising
| 
| align=center| 3
| align=center| 5:00
| Honolulu, Hawaii, United States
| 
|-
| Win
| align=center| 8–2
| Hikaru Sato
| TKO (punches)
| Pancrase: 2007 Neo-Blood Tournament Finals
| 
| align=center| 1
| align=center| 1:09
| Tokyo, Japan
| 
|-
| Win
| align=center| 7–2
| Chris Gates
| TKO (submission to punches)
| EliteXC Destiny
| 
| align=center| 1
| align=center| 1:18
| Southaven, Mississippi, United States
| 
|-
| Win
| align=center| 6–2
| Yuji Sakuragi
| Decision (unanimous)
| Pancrase: 2006 Neo-Blood Tournament Finals
| 
| align=center| 2
| align=center| 5:00
| Tokyo, Japan
| 
|-
| Win
| align=center| 5–2
| Keitaro Maeda
| TKO (punches)
| GCM: D.O.G. 5
| 
| align=center| 1
| align=center| 4:40
| Tokyo, Japan
| 
|-
| Loss
| align=center| 4–2
| Kozo Urita
| KO (punch)
| Pancrase: Blow 1
| 
| align=center| 1
| align=center| 0:40
| Tokyo, Japan
| 
|-
| Win
| align=center| 4–1
| Yuta Nakamura
| TKO (punches)
| Pancrase: Spiral 9
| 
| align=center| 1
| align=center| 0:57
| Tokyo, Japan
| 
|-
| Win
| align=center| 3–1
| Brandon Wolff
| TKO (punches)
| K-1: World Grand Prix Hawaii
| 
| align=center| 2
| align=center| 2:49
| Hawaii, United States
| 
|-
| Win
| align=center| 2–1
| Oleg Bazayev
| KO (punches)
| GCM: D.O.G. 2
| 
| align=center| 1
| align=center| 0:28
| Tokyo, Japan
| 
|-
| Win
| align=center| 1–1
| Masaya Inoue
| Decision (unanimous)
| Shooto: 1/29 in Korakuen Hall
| 
| align=center| 2
| align=center| 5:00
| Tokyo, Japan
| 
|-
| Loss
| align=center| 0–1
| Joe Doerksen
| Decision (unanimous)
| SuperBrawl 35
| 
| align=center| 3
| align=center| 5:00
| Honolulu, Hawaii, United States
|

See also
 List of male mixed martial artists

References

External links
Official UFC Profile
 

1981 births
Doping cases in mixed martial arts
Living people
Japanese male mixed martial artists
Japanese sportspeople in doping cases
Middleweight mixed martial artists
Mixed martial artists utilizing freestyle wrestling
Japanese male sport wrestlers
Sportspeople from Tokyo
Deep (mixed martial arts) champions
Road Fighting Championship champions
Ultimate Fighting Championship male fighters